The Men's 25m standard pistol event at the 2010 South American Games was held on March 25 at 9:00.

Individual

Medalists

Results

Qualification

Team

Medalists

Results

References
Final
Team

25m Standard Pistol M